Hill Township is a civil township of Ogemaw County in the U.S. state of Michigan.  As of the 2010 census, the township population was 1,361.

Communities

Geography

Demographics
As of the census of 2000, there were 1,584 people, 742 households, and 503 families residing in the township. The racial makeup of the township was 97.47% White, 0.88% Native American, 0.44% Asian, 0.13% from other races, and 1.07% from two or more races. Hispanic or Latino of any race were 1.07% of the population.

There were 742 households, out of which 15.2% had children under the age of 18 living with them, 59.0% were married couples living together, 5.5% had a female householder with no husband present, and 32.1% were non-families. 27.8% of all households were made up of individuals, and 16.7% had someone living alone who was 65 years of age or older.  The average household size was 2.13 and the average family size was 2.53.

In the township the population was spread out, with 15.3% under the age of 18, 4.1% from 18 to 24, 17.9% from 25 to 44, 35.0% from 45 to 64, and 27.7% who were 65 years of age or older.  The median age was 54 years. For every 100 females, there were 99.5 males.  For every 100 females age 18 and over, there were 98.2 males.

The median income for a household in the township was $29,821, and the median income for a family was $34,375. Males had a median income of $31,250 versus $25,000 for females. The per capita income for the township was $18,770.  About 11.9% of families and 13.4% of the population were below the poverty line, including 19.4% of those under age 18 and 10.2% of those age 65 or over.

References

Townships in Ogemaw County, Michigan
Townships in Michigan